Derek Palmer Jr. (born 2 November 1986) is a British racing driver currently competing in the British Touring Car Championship. He made his debut in 2015.

Racing career

Palmer began his career in 2006 in the Dutch Supercar Challenge, he raced in the championship for three years from 2006-2008. In 2008 he switched to the GT4 European Series, he raced in the series up until 2010. In 2008 and 2010 he also raced in the British GT. In October 2014, it was announced that Palmer would make his British Touring Car Championship debut with Infiniti Support Our Paras Racing driving an Infiniti Q50. However, in May 2015, Infiniti withdrew their support and the team continued under the Support Our Paras Racing banner.

Racing record

Complete British Touring Car Championship results
(key) (Races in bold indicate pole position – 1 point awarded just in first race; races in italics indicate fastest lap – 1 point awarded all races; * signifies that driver led race for at least one lap – 1 point given all races)

Complete TCR UK Touring Car Championship results
(key) (Races in bold indicate pole position – 1 point awarded just in first race; races in italics indicate fastest lap – 1 point awarded all races; * signifies that driver led race for at least one lap – 1 point given all races)

References

External links
 

1986 births
Living people
British Touring Car Championship drivers
Scottish racing drivers
GT4 European Series drivers